Xanax was a Serbian musical group from Belgrade.

Discography

Studio albums 
 Ispod površine (2012)

Other appearances 
 "Ispod površine" (Femixeta; 2011)
 "Savršena rešetka" (Re start II (BiH); 2012)
 "Reč iz filma" (Femixeta; 2013)

References

External links 
 Xanax at YouTube
 Xanax at Discogs
 Xanax at B92.fm
 Xanax at Last.fm

Serbian rock music groups
Serbian alternative rock groups
Serbian experimental musical groups
Musical groups from Belgrade
Musical groups established in 2008
Serbian electronic rock musical groups